Old Hickory Lake is a reservoir in north central Tennessee.

The city of Hendersonville is situated on the northern shoreline of the lake, and Old Hickory, a portion of Metropolitan Nashville-Davidson County, is located on the southern side of the lake, just upstream of the lock and dam. The dam and lake are named after President Andrew Jackson (nicknamed "Old Hickory"), who lived in the vicinity, at The Hermitage.

The lock, dam, powerhouse and lake are operated and supervised by U.S. Army Corps of Engineers staff under the direction of the District Engineer at Nashville. Construction started in January 1952, and dam closure was completed in June 1954.

Historic Rock Castle, completed in 1796, is the former home of pioneer Daniel Smith. He is known for his contributions in settling Hendersonville in the early nineteenth century. The lake now borders this property.

Old Hickory Lake is a mainstream storage impoundment on the Cumberland River operated by the U.S. Army Corps of Engineers. The reservoir contains  at an elevation of 445 feet (above sea level) and extends 97.3 river miles. Public facilities include eight marinas, two Corps-operated campgrounds, and 41 boat access sites, as well as the Old Hickory Lake Arboretum.

See also 
 House of Cash

References

External links
 Old Hickory Lake - official site

Reservoirs in Tennessee
Protected areas of Davidson County, Tennessee
Protected areas of Smith County, Tennessee
Protected areas of Sumner County, Tennessee
Protected areas of Trousdale County, Tennessee
Protected areas of Wilson County, Tennessee
Bodies of water of Davidson County, Tennessee
Bodies of water of Smith County, Tennessee
Bodies of water of Sumner County, Tennessee
Bodies of water of Trousdale County, Tennessee
Bodies of water of Wilson County, Tennessee
1954 establishments in Tennessee
Cumberland River